, (born on November 29, 1993 in Saitama Prefecture, Japan) is a Japanese voice actress, actress and former singer.

Biography 

In 2004, Sayaka Kitahara became a member of Hello Pro Egg, under Hello! Project. In 2008, she became a part of the unit MilkyWay, as a tie-in to the anime Kirarin Revolution, in which all three members of the group have parts, with Kitahara as Noel Yukino ; the band sing the last theme songs of the show, and their two singles rank in the top 10 of the oricon music charts. The series ended in 2009, then in 2010 she plays a main part in the horror movie Kaidan Shin Mimibukuro Kaiki.

She graduated from Hello Pro Egg in 2011, and begins a solo career. Since then, she voices the part of Aoi Sorano in the anime Inazuma Eleven GO, and sings the ending themes of the series, as "Sorano Aoi (CV: Kitahara Sayaka)"; her first three solo singles as "Sorano Aoi (...)" also chart on oricon.　
On September 9, 2012 it was announced that Kitahara Sayaka would join Avex beginning October 2012.  On 2013, she became a part of the unit COLORS(カラーズ） as "Sorano Aoi (CV:Kitahara Sayaka) with "Morimura Konoha(CV:Yuki Aoi)", then with "Mizukawa Minori(CV:Takagaki Ayahi)". Now she is also a part of COLORS but as "Kitahara Sayaka" with "Kobayashi Yuu". This is the first time she sings as "Kitahara Sayaka", not "Sorano Aoi(CV:Kitahara Sayaka)" nor "Yukino Noel(CV:Kitahara Sayaka)".

On July 19, 2022, Kitahara tested positive for COVID-19.

Solo discography

Singles

As « Sorano Aoi (CV: Kitahara Sayaka) »

2011/06/22 : 
2011/11/09 : 
2012/02/08 : 
2012/06/13 : 
2013/03/06 :

COLORS

2013/07/03 : 
2013/11/16 : 
2014/03/06 :

Filmography

Anime 

Film
2010 : Kaidan Shin Mimibukuro Kaiki

Dubbing
Red Dwarf, Waitress Greta (Amrita Acharia)
Carmen Sandiego, The Driver (Toks Olagundoye)

Video Games 
Girls' Frontline (2014) SPR A3G, Type 03.
White Cat Project (2014) Tin
Girl Friend Beta (2015) Tamaki Hayashi
The Idolmaster Shiny Colors (2018) Mei izumi.
galaxyz (2021) Aina

References

External links 
 Official Site

 Official blog

 Official profile

 Official profile

 

1993 births
Living people
Japanese women singers
Japanese child singers
Japanese voice actresses
Japanese idols
Hello! Project members
Musicians from Saitama Prefecture
Anime musicians
21st-century Japanese actresses
Ken Production voice actors